This article contains information about La Toya Jackson's album and singles. She has released eleven studio albums, beginning with her self-titled album in 1980. She has had one single on the US Billboard Hot 100 and three albums chart on the US Billboard 200.

Albums

Studio albums

Soundtrack albums

Extended plays

Singles

Promotional singles

As a featured artist

Videography

Music videos

Concert videos

Footnotes 
1. "Baby Sister" is notable as the winner of an Outstanding Song Award at the 1985 World Popular Song Festival.

References 

Discography
Pop music discographies
Discographies of American artists